Safia may refer to:


People
 Safia (given name)

Places
 Safia, Burkina Faso
 Safia, Yemen
 Safia Rural LLG, Papua New Guinea

Biology
 Safia (moth), a genus of moth

Music
 Safia (band), an Australian indie electronica band, best known for featuring on the 2014 Peking Duk song "Take Me Over"

See also
 Sofia (disambiguation)